Neolamprologus leleupi (lemon cichlid) is a species of cichlid endemic to Lake Tanganyika where it occurs throughout the lake.  It is a recess-dweller, inhabiting cracks and crevices.  It feeds on invertebrates living in the rich biocover of the substrate.  This species reaches a length of  TL.  The color of this fish ranges from bright yellow to deep brown. Both color variations exist at each location where this species is found. This relatively small cichlid is a substrate spawner (cave spawner). It is easily confused with the very similar N. longior (Staeck, 1980) a fish also endemic to Lake Tanganyika. The specific name honours the Belgian entomologist Narcisse Leleup (1912-2001), who collected the type.

See also
List of freshwater aquarium fish species

References

leleupi
Taxa named by Max Poll
Fish described in 1956